Judith Pamela Butler (born February 24, 1956) is an American philosopher and gender studies writer whose work has influenced political philosophy, ethics, and the fields of third-wave feminism, queer theory, and literary theory. In 1993, Butler began teaching at the University of California, Berkeley, where they have served, beginning in 1998, as the Maxine Elliot Professor in the Department of Comparative Literature and the Program of Critical Theory. They are also the Hannah Arendt Chair at the European Graduate School (EGS).

Butler is best known for their books Gender Trouble: Feminism and the Subversion of Identity (1990) and Bodies That Matter: On the Discursive Limits of Sex (1993), in which they challenge conventional notions of gender and develop their theory of gender performativity. This theory has had a major influence on feminist and queer scholarship. Their work is often studied and debated in film studies courses emphasizing gender studies and performativity in discourse.

Butler has spoken on many contemporary political issues, including Israeli politics and in support of LGBT rights.

Early life and education
Judith Butler was born on February 24, 1956, in Cleveland, Ohio, to a family of Hungarian-Jewish and Russian-Jewish descent. Most of their maternal grandmother's family perished in the Holocaust. Butler's parents were practicing Reform Jews. Their mother was raised Orthodox, eventually becoming Conservative and then Reform, while their father was raised Reform. As a child and teenager, Butler attended both Hebrew school and special classes on Jewish ethics, where they received their "first training in philosophy". Butler stated in a 2010 interview with Haaretz that they began the ethics classes at the age of 14 and that they were created as a form of punishment by Butler's Hebrew school's Rabbi because they were "too talkative in class". Butler also claimed to be "thrilled" by the idea of these tutorials, and when asked what they wanted to study in these special sessions, they responded with three questions preoccupying them at the time: "Why was Spinoza excommunicated from the synagogue? Could German Idealism be held accountable for Nazism? And how was one to understand existential theology, including the work of Martin Buber?"

Butler attended Bennington College before transferring to Yale University, where they studied philosophy and received a Bachelor of Arts in 1978 and a Doctor of Philosophy in 1984. They spent one academic year at Heidelberg University as a Fulbright Scholar. Butler taught at Wesleyan University, George Washington University, and Johns Hopkins University before joining University of California, Berkeley, in 1993. In 2002, they held the Spinoza Chair of Philosophy at the University of Amsterdam. In addition, they joined the department of English and Comparative Literature at Columbia University as Wun Tsun Tam Mellon Visiting Professor of the Humanities in the spring semesters of 2012, 2013 and 2014 with the option of remaining as full-time faculty.

Butler serves on the editorial or advisory board of several academic journals, including Janus Unbound: Journal of Critical Studies, JAC: A Journal of Rhetoric, Culture, and Politics and Signs: Journal of Women in Culture and Society.

Overview of major works

Performative Acts and Gender Constitution (1988)
In the essay "Performative Acts and Gender Constitution: An Essay in Phenomenology and Feminist Theory" Judith Butler proposes that gender is performative. Because gender identity is established through behavior, there is a possibility to construct different genders via different behaviors.

Gender Trouble (1990)

Gender Trouble: Feminism and the Subversion of Identity was first published in 1990, selling over 100,000 copies internationally, in multiple languages.  Gender Trouble discusses the works of Sigmund Freud, Simone de Beauvoir, Julia Kristeva, Jacques Lacan, Luce Irigaray, Monique Wittig, Jacques Derrida, and Michel Foucault.

Butler offers a critique of the terms gender and sex as they have been used by feminists. Butler argues that feminism made a mistake in trying to make "women" a discrete, ahistorical group with common characteristics. Butler writes that this approach reinforces the binary view of gender relations.  Butler believes that feminists should not try to define "women" and they also believe that feminists should "focus on providing an account of how power functions and shapes our understandings of womanhood not only in the society at large but also within the feminist movement." Finally, Butler aims to break the supposed links between sex and gender so that gender and desire can be "flexible, free floating and not caused by other stable factors". The idea of identity as free and flexible and gender as a performance, not an essence, has been one of the foundations of queer theory.

Imitation and Gender Insubordination (1991)
Inside/Out: Lesbian Theories, Gay Theories is a collection of writings of gay and lesbian social theorists. Butler's contribution argues that no transparent revelation is afforded by using the terms "gay" or "lesbian" yet there is a political imperative to do so. Butler employs "the concepts of play/performance, drag, and imitation" to describe the formation of gender and sexuality as continually created subjectivities always at risk of dissolution from non-performance."

Bodies That Matter (1993)
Bodies That Matter: On the Discursive Limits of "Sex" seeks to clear up readings and supposed misreadings of performativity that view the enactment of sex/gender as a daily choice. Butler emphasizes the role of repetition in performativity, making use of Derrida's theory of iterability, which is a form of citationality:

Performativity cannot be understood outside of a process of iterability, a regularized and constrained repetition of norms. And this repetition is not performed by a subject; this repetition is what enables a subject and constitutes the temporal condition for the subject. This iterability implies that 'performance' is not a singular 'act' or event, but a ritualized production, a ritual reiterated under and through constraint, under and through the force of prohibition and taboo, with the threat of ostracism and even death controlling and compelling the shape of the production, but not, I will insist, determining it fully in advance.

Excitable Speech (1997)

In Excitable Speech: A Politics of the Performative, Butler surveys the problems of hate speech and censorship. They argue that censorship is difficult to evaluate, and that in some cases it may be useful or even necessary, while in others it may be worse than tolerance.

Butler argues that hate speech exists retrospectively, only after being declared such by state authorities. In this way, the state reserves for itself the power to define hate speech and, conversely, the limits of acceptable discourse. In this connection, Butler criticizes feminist legal scholar Catharine MacKinnon's argument against pornography for its unquestioning acceptance of the state's power to censor.

Deploying Foucault's argument from the first volume of The History of Sexuality, Butler claims that any attempt at censorship, legal or otherwise, necessarily propagates the very language it seeks to forbid. As Foucault argues, for example, the strict sexual mores of 19th-century Western Europe did nothing but amplify the discourse of sexuality they sought to control. Extending this argument using Derrida and Lacan, Butler claims that censorship is primitive to language, and that the linguistic "I" is a mere effect of an originary censorship. In this way, Butler questions the possibility of any genuinely oppositional discourse; "If speech depends upon censorship, then the principle that one might seek to oppose is at once the formative principle of oppositional speech".

Precarious Life (2004)

Precarious Life: The Powers of Mourning and Violence opens a new line in Judith Butler's work that has had a great impact on their subsequent thought, especially on books like Frames of War: When Is Life Grievable? (2009) or Notes Toward a Performative Theory of Assembly (2015), as well as on other contemporary thinkers. In this book, Butler deals with issues of precarity, vulnerability, grief and contemporary political violence in the face of the War on terror and the realities of prisoners at Guantanamo Bay and similar detention centers. Drawing on Foucault, they characterize the form of power at work in these places of "indefinite detention" as a convergence of sovereignty and governmentality. The "state of exception" deployed here is in fact more complex than the one pointed out by Agamben in his Homo Sacer, since the government is in a more ambiguous relation to law —it may comply with it or suspend it, depending on its interests, and this is itself a tool of the state to produce its own sovereignty. Butler also points towards problems in international law treatises like the Geneva Conventions. In practice, these only protect people who belong to (or act in the name of) a recognized state, and therefore are helpless in situations of abuse toward stateless people, people who do not enjoy a recognized citizenship or people who are labelled "terrorists", and therefore understood as acting on their own behalf as irrational "killing machines" that need to be held captive due to their "dangerousness".

Butler also writes here on vulnerability and precariousness as intrinsic to the human condition. This is due to our inevitable interdependency from other precarious subjects, who are never really "complete" or autonomous but instead always "dispossessed" on the Other. This is manifested in shared experiences like grief and loss, that can form the basis for a recognition of our shared human (vulnerable) condition. However, not every loss can be mourned in the same way, and in fact not every life can be conceived of as such (as situated in a condition common to ours). Through a critical engagement with Levinas, they will explore how certain representations prevent lives from being considered worthy of being lived or taken into account, precluding the mourning of certain Others, and with that the recognition of them and their losses as equally human. This preoccupation with the dignifying or dehumanizing role of practices of framing and representations will constitute one of the central elements of Frames of War (2009).

Undoing Gender (2004)

Undoing Gender collects Butler's reflections on gender, sex, sexuality, psychoanalysis and the medical treatment of intersex people for a more general readership than many of their other books. Butler revisits and refines their notion of performativity and focuses on the question of undoing "restrictively normative conceptions of sexual and gendered life".

Butler discusses how gender is performed without one being conscious of it, but says that it does not mean this performativity is "automatic or mechanical". They argue that we have desires that do not originate from our personhood, but rather, from social norms. The writer also debates our notions of "human" and "less-than-human" and how these culturally imposed ideas can keep one from having a "viable life" as the biggest concerns are usually about whether a person will be accepted if their desires differ from normality. Butler states that one may feel the need of being recognized in order to live, but that at the same time, the conditions to be recognized make life "unlivable". The writer proposes an interrogation of such conditions so that people who resist them may have more possibilities of living.

In Butler's discussion of intersex issues and people, Butler addresses the case of David Reimer, a person whose sex was medically reassigned from male to female after a botched circumcision at eight months of age. Reimer was "made" female by doctors, but later in life identified as "really" male, married and became a stepfather to his wife's three children, and went on to tell his story in As Nature Made Him: The Boy Who Was Raised as a Girl, which he wrote with John Colapinto.  Reimer died by suicide in 2004.

Giving an Account of Oneself (2005)
In Giving an Account of Oneself, Butler develops an ethics based on the opacity of the subject to itself; in other words, the limits of self-knowledge. Primarily borrowing from Theodor Adorno, Michel Foucault, Friedrich Nietzsche, Jean Laplanche, Adriana Cavarero and Emmanuel Levinas, Butler develops a theory of the formation of the subject. Butler theorizes the subject in relation to the social – a community of others and their norms – which is beyond the control of the subject it forms, as precisely the very condition of that subject's formation, the resources by which the subject becomes recognizably human, a grammatical "I", in the first place.

Butler accepts the claim that if the subject is opaque to itself the limitations of its free ethical responsibility and obligations are due to the limits of narrative, presuppositions of language and projection.

Instead Butler argues for an ethics based precisely on the limits of self-knowledge as the limits of responsibility itself. Any concept of responsibility which demands the full transparency of the self to itself, an entirely accountable self, necessarily does violence to the opacity which marks the constitution of the self it addresses. The scene of address by which responsibility is enabled is always already a relation between subjects who are variably opaque to themselves and to each other. The ethics that Butler envisions is therefore one in which the responsible self knows the limits of its knowing, recognizes the limits of its capacity to give an account of itself to others, and respects those limits as symptomatically human. To take seriously one's opacity to oneself in ethical deliberation means then to critically interrogate the social world in which one comes to be human in the first place and which remains precisely that which one cannot know about oneself. In this way, Butler locates social and political critique at the core of ethical practice.

Notes Toward a Performative Theory of Assembly (2015) 

In Notes Toward a Performative Theory of Assembly, Butler discusses the power of public gatherings, considering what they signify and how they work. They use this framework to analyze the power and possibilities of protests, such as the Black Lives Matter protests regarding the deaths of Michael Brown and Eric Garner in 2014.

The Force of Nonviolence (2020) 
In The Force of Nonviolence: An Ethico-Political Bind, Butler connects the ideologies of nonviolence and the political struggle for social equality. They review the traditional understanding of "nonviolence," stating that it "is often misunderstood as a passive practice that emanates from a calm region of the soul, or as an individualist ethical relation to existing forms of power." Instead of this understanding, Butler argues that "nonviolence is an ethical position found in the midst of the political field."

Reception
Butler's work has been influential in feminist and queer theory, cultural studies, and continental philosophy. Yet their contribution to a range of other disciplines—such as psychoanalysis, literary, film, and performance studies as well as visual arts—has also been significant. Their theory of gender performativity as well as their conception of "critically queer" have not only transformed understandings of gender and queer identity in the academic world, but have shaped and mobilized various kinds of political activism, particularly queer activism, across the globe. "Doing gender" as a theory has also gained additional attention through its resonance with Butler's thesis that gender is a "performance".(Butler, 1) Butler's work has also entered into contemporary debates on the teaching of gender, gay parenting, and the depathologization of transgender people.

Some academics and political activists see in Butler a departure from the sex/gender dichotomy and a non-essentialist conception of gender—along with an insistence that power helps form the subject—which purportedly brought new insights to feminist and queer praxis, thought, and studies. Darin Barney of McGill University wrote that:

In 1998, Denis Dutton's journal Philosophy and Literature awarded Butler first prize in its fourth annual "Bad Writing Competition", which set out to "celebrate bad writing from the most stylistically lamentable passages found in scholarly books and articles."

Some critics have accused Butler of elitism due to their difficult prose style, while others claim that Butler reduces gender to "discourse" or promotes a form of gender voluntarism. Susan Bordo, for example, has argued that Butler reduces gender to language and has contended that the body is a major part of gender, in opposition to Butler's conception of gender as performative. A particularly vocal critic has been feminist Martha Nussbaum, who has argued that Butler misreads J. L. Austin's idea of performative utterance, makes erroneous legal claims, forecloses an essential site of resistance by repudiating pre-cultural agency, and provides no "normative theory of social justice and human dignity." Finally, Nancy Fraser's critique of Butler was part of a famous exchange between the two theorists.  Fraser has suggested that Butler's focus on performativity distances them from "everyday ways of talking and thinking about ourselves. ... Why should we use such a self-distancing idiom?" Butler responded to criticisms in the preface to the 1999-edition Gender Trouble by asking whether there is "a value to be derived from...experiences of linguistic difficulty."

More recently, several critics — such as semiotician Viviane Namaste
— have criticised Judith Butler's Undoing Gender for under-emphasizing the intersectional aspects of gender-based violence. For example, Timothy Laurie notes that Butler's use of phrases like "gender politics" and "gender violence" in relation to assaults on transgender individuals in the United States can "[scour] a landscape filled with class and labour relations, racialised urban stratification, and complex interactions between sexual identity, sexual practices and sex work", and produce instead "a clean surface on which struggles over 'the human' are imagined to play out".

German feminist Alice Schwarzer speaks of Butler's "radical intellectual games" that would not change how society classifies and treats a woman; thus, by eliminating female and male identity Butler would have abolished the discourse about sexism in the queer community. Schwarzer also accuses Butler of remaining silent about the oppression of women and homosexuals in the Islamic world, while readily exercising their right to same-sex-marriage in the United States; instead, Butler would sweepingly defend Islam, including Islamism, from critics.

EGS philosophy professor Geoffrey Bennington, translator for many of Derrida's books, criticised Butler's introduction to the 1997 translation of Derrida's 1967 Of Grammatology.

Non-academic
 Before a 2017 democracy conference in Brazil, Butler was burnt "in effigy".

Bruno Perreau has written that Butler was literally depicted as an "antichrist", both because of their gender and their Jewish identity, the fear of minority politics and critical studies being expressed through fantasies of a corrupted body.

Political activism

Much of Butler's early political activism centered around queer and feminist issues, and they served, for a period of time, as the chair of the board of the International Gay and Lesbian Human Rights Commission.  Over the years, Butler has been particularly active in the gay and lesbian rights, feminist, and anti-war movements. They have also written and spoken out on issues ranging from affirmative action and gay marriage to the wars in Iraq and Afghanistan, and the prisoners detained at Guantanamo Bay.  More recently, Butler has been active in the Occupy movement and has publicly expressed support for a version of the 2005 BDS (Boycott, Divestment and Sanctions) campaign against Israel.

They emphasize that Israel does not, and should not, be taken to represent all Jews or Jewish opinion. Butler has criticized some forms of Zionism for weaponizing the victimhood role. Butler states that this weaponization can result in widespread misuse of the accusation "antisemitism", which may in fact trivialize the accusation's gravity and weight.

On September 7, 2006, Butler participated in a faculty-organized teach-in against the 2006 Lebanon War at the University of California, Berkeley. Another widely publicized moment occurred in June 2010, when Butler refused the Civil Courage Award (Zivilcouragepreis) of the Christopher Street Day (CSD) Parade in Berlin, Germany at the award ceremony. They cited racist comments on the part of organizers and a general failure of CSD organizations to distance themselves from racism in general and from anti-Muslim excuses for war more specifically. Criticizing the event's commercialism, Butler went on to name several groups that they commended as stronger opponents of "homophobia, transphobia, sexism, racism, and militarism".

In October 2011, Butler attended Occupy Wall Street and, in reference to calls for clarification of the protesters' demands, they said:

People have asked, so what are the demands? What are the demands all of these people are making? Either they say there are no demands and that leaves your critics confused, or they say that the demands for social equality and economic justice are impossible demands. And the impossible demands, they say, are just not practical. If hope is an impossible demand, then we demand the impossible – that the right to shelter, food and employment are impossible demands, then we demand the impossible. If it is impossible to demand that those who profit from the recession redistribute their wealth and cease their greed, then yes, we demand the impossible.

Butler is an executive member of FFIPP – Educational Network for Human Rights in Israel/Palestine. They are also a member of the advisory board of Jewish Voice for Peace. In mainstream US politics, they expressed support for Hillary Clinton in the 2016 election.

Adorno Prize affair

When Butler received the 2012 Adorno Prize, the prize committee came under attack from Israel's Ambassador to Germany Yakov Hadas-Handelsman; the director of the Simon Wiesenthal Center's office in Jerusalem, Efraim Zuroff; and the German Central Council of Jews. They were upset at Butler's selection because of Butler's remarks about Israel and specifically Butler's "calls for a boycott against Israel". Butler responded saying that "[Butler] did not take attacks from German Jewish leaders personally". Rather, they wrote, the attacks are "directed against everyone who is critical against Israel and its current policies".

In a letter to the Mondoweiss website, Butler asserted that they developed strong ethical views on the basis of Jewish philosophical thought and that it is "blatantly untrue, absurd, and painful for anyone to argue that those who formulate a criticism of the State of Israel is anti-Semitic or, if Jewish, self-hating".

Comments on Hamas and Hezbollah 
Butler was criticized for statements they had made about Hamas and Hezbollah. Butler was accused of describing them as "social movements that are progressive, that are on the Left, that are part of a global Left." They were accused of defending "Hezbollah and Hamas as progressive organizations" and supporting their tactics.

Butler responded to these criticisms by stating that their remarks on Hamas and Hezbollah were taken completely out of context and, in so doing, their established views on non-violence were contradicted and misrepresented. Butler describes the origin of their remarks on Hamas and Hezbollah in the following way:
I was asked by a member of an academic audience a few years ago whether I thought Hamas and Hezbollah belonged to "the global left" and I replied with two points. My first point was merely descriptive: those political organizations define themselves as anti-imperialist, and anti-imperialism is one characteristic of the global left, so on that basis one could describe them as part of the global left. My second point was then critical: as with any group on the left, one has to decide whether one is for that group or against that group, and one needs to critically evaluate their stand.

Comments on Black Lives Matter 
In a January 2015 interview with George Yancy of The New York Times, Butler discussed the Black Lives Matter movement. They said:
What is implied by this statement [Black Lives Matter], a statement that should be obviously true, but apparently is not? If black lives do not matter, then they are not really regarded as lives, since a life is supposed to matter. So what we see is that some lives matter more than others, that some lives matter so much that they need to be protected at all costs, and that other lives matter less, or not at all. And when that becomes the situation, then the lives that do not matter so much, or do not matter at all, can be killed or lost, can be exposed to conditions of destitution, and there is no concern, or even worse, that is regarded as the way it is supposed to be...When people engage in concerted actions across racial lines to build communities based on equality, to defend the rights of those who are disproportionately imperiled to have a chance to live without the fear of dying quite suddenly at the hands of the police. There are many ways to do this, in the street, the office, the home, and in the media. Only through such an ever-growing cross-racial struggle against racism can we begin to achieve a sense of all the lives that really do matter. 
The dialogue draws heavily on their 2004 book Precarious Life: The Powers of Mourning and Violence.

Avital Ronell sexual harassment case
On May 11, 2018, Butler led a group of scholars in writing a letter to New York University following the sexual harassment suit filed by a former NYU graduate student against his advisor Avital Ronell. The signatories acknowledged not having had access to the confidential findings of the investigation that followed the Title IX complaint against Ronell. Nonetheless, they accused the complainant of waging a "malicious campaign" against Ronell. The signatories also wrote that the presumed "malicious intention has animated and sustained this legal nightmare" for a highly regarded scholar. "If she were to be terminated or relieved of her duties, the injustice would be widely recognized and opposed." Butler, the chief signatory, invoked their title as President Elect of the Modern Language Association. James J. Marino, a professor at Cleveland State University and a member of the MLA, started a petition to demand Butler's resignation or removal from their post. He argued that "Protesting against one instance of punishment is only a means to the larger end of preserving senior faculty's privilege of impunity. ... [Butler] was standing up for an old, corrupt, and long-standing way of doing business. The time for doing business that way is over. We should never look back." Some three months later, Butler apologized to the MLA for the letter. "I acknowledged that I should not have allowed the MLA affiliation to go forward with my name," Butler wrote to the Chronicle of Higher Education. "I expressed regret to the MLA officers and staff, and my colleagues accepted my apology. I extend that same apology to MLA members."

Comments on the anti-gender movement and trans-exclusionary radical feminism

Butler said in 2020 that trans-exclusionary radical feminism is "a fringe movement that is seeking to speak in the name of the mainstream, and that our responsibility is to refuse to let that happen." In 2021, they, drawing from Umberto Eco who understood "fascism" as "a beehive of contradictions", noted that the term fascism "describes" the "anti-gender ideology". They cautioned self-declared feminists from allying with anti-gender movements in targeting trans, non-binary, and genderqueer people. Butler also explored the issue in a 2019 paper in which they argued that "the confusion of discourses is part of what constitutes the fascist structure and appeal of at least some of these [anti-gender] movements. One can oppose gender as a cultural import from the North at the same time that one can see that very opposition as a social movement against further colonization of the South. The result is not a turn to the Left, but an embrace of ethno-nationalism."

The Guardian interview
On September 7, 2021, The Guardian published an interview of Butler by Jules Gleeson that included Butler's view of trans-exclusionary feminists. In response to a question about the Wi Spa controversy,The Press Gazette stated that Butler in the Guardian article stated that "The anti-gender ideology is one of the dominant strains of fascism in our times." Within a few hours of publication, three paragraphs including this statement were removed, with a note explaining "This article was edited on 7 September 2021 to reflect developments which occurred after the interview took place."

The Guardian was then accused of censoring Judith Butler for having compared TERFs to fascists. British writer Roz Kaveney called it "a truly shocking moment of bigoted dishonesty", while British transgender activist and writer Juno Dawson, among others, observed that The Guardian had inadvertently triggered the Streisand effect, in which an attempt to censor yields the unintended consequence of increasing awareness of a topic. The next day, The Guardian acknowledged "a failure in our editorial standards".

Personal life

Butler is a lesbian, legally non-binary, and as of 2020 said they use both they/them and she/her pronouns but prefer to use "they" pronouns. Butler indicated that they were "never at home" with being assigned female at birth.

They live in Berkeley with their partner Wendy Brown and son, Isaac.

Selected honors and awards
Butler has had a visiting appointment at Birkbeck, University of London (2009–).

1999: Guggenheim Fellowship
2001: David R Kessler Award for LGBTQ Studies, CLAGS: The Center for LGBTQ Studies
2007: Elected to the American Philosophical Society
2008: Mellon Award for their exemplary contributions to scholarship in the humanities
2010: "25 Visionaries Who Are Changing Your World", Utne Reader
2012: Theodor W. Adorno Award
2013: Doctorate of Letters, honoris causa, University of St. Andrews
2013: Doctorate of Letters, honoris causa, McGill University
2014: Doctorate of Letters, honoris causa, University of Fribourg
2014: Named one of PinkNews's top 11 Jewish gay and lesbian icons
2015: Elected as a Corresponding Fellow of the British Academy
2018: Doctorate of Letters, honoris causa, University of Belgrade
2018: Butler delivered the Gifford Lectures with their series entitled 'My Life, Your Life: Equality and the Philosophy of Non-Violence'
2019: Elected as Fellow to the American Academy of Arts and Sciences.

Publications
Butler's books have been translated into numerous languages; Gender Trouble has been translated into twenty-seven languages. They have co-authored and edited over a dozen volumes—most recently, Dispossession: The Performative in the Political (2013), coauthored with Athena Athanasiou. Over the years Butler has also published many influential essays, interviews, and public presentations. Butler is considered by many to be "one of the most influential voices in contemporary political theory," and the most widely read and influential gender studies academic in the world.

The following is a partial list of Butler's publications.

Books
  [Their doctoral dissertation.]

Book chapters
 
 
 

 
 
 
 
 
 
  A collection of essays on the work of Avital Ronell.
 
  Details.

Notes

References

Further reading

Burgos, Elvira. (2008). Qué cuenta como una vida. La pregunta por la libertad en Judith Butler. Madrid: Antonio Machado. 
Chambers, Samuel A. and Carver, Terrell. (2008). Judith Butler and Political Theory: Troubling Politics. New York: Routledge. 
Cheah, Pheng. (1996). "Mattering". Diacritics, 26 (1), pp. 108–139.
 
Kirby, Vicki. (2006). Judith Butler: Live Theory.  London: Continuum. 
Eldred, Michael. (2008). [http://www.arte-fact.org/mtphysfm.html 'Metaphysics of Feminism: A Critical Note on Judith Butler's Gender Trouble'''].
 
Halsema, Annemie; Kwastek, Katja; van den Oever, Roel (eds.). (2021). Bodies That Still Matter. Resonances of the Work of Judith Butler. Amsterdam: Amsterdam University Press.
  Pdf. Considers performativity from a linguistic perspective.
López, Silvia. (2019). Los cuerpos que importan en Judith Butler. Madrid: Dos Bigotes. 
Perreau, Bruno. (2004). Queer Theory: The French Response, Stanford, CA: Stanford University Press. 
Salih, Sarah. (2004). The Judith Butler Reader. Malden, Massachusetts: Blackwell. 
Salih, Sarah. (2002). Routledge Critical Thinkers: Judith Butler. New York: Routledge. 
Schippers, Birgit. (2014). The Political Philosophy of Judith Butler. New York: Routledge. 
Thiem, Annika. (2008). Unbecoming Subjects: Judith Butler, Moral Philosophy, and Critical Responsibility.'' New York: Fordham University Press.

External links

 Biography – University of California, Berkeley
 
 approach the notion of affinity through a discussion of "Disruptive Kinship," co-sponsored by Villa Gillet and the School of Writing at The New School for Public Engagement.
 Interview of Judith Butler about their new book "Frames of War" on New Statesman
 Review of "Giving an Account of Oneself. Ethical Violence and Responsibility", by Judith Butler, Barcelona Metropolis Autumn 2010. 
"Dictionary of Literary Biography on Judith P. Butler (page 3)"
Interview with Judith Butler about politics, economy, control societies, gender and identity (2011) 

1956 births
20th-century American educators
20th-century American essayists
20th-century American philosophers
20th-century American women writers
20th-century American LGBT people
21st-century American educators
21st-century American essayists
21st-century American philosophers
21st-century American women writers
21st-century American LGBT people
American Ashkenazi Jews
American democratic socialists
American ethicists
American feminist writers
American lesbian writers
American literary critics
American media critics
American people of Hungarian-Jewish descent
American people of Russian-Jewish descent
American political philosophers
American social commentators
American women critics
American women sociologists
Anti-Zionism in the United States
Bennington College alumni
Columbia University faculty
American consciousness researchers and theorists
Continental philosophers
Corresponding Fellows of the British Academy
Critical theorists
Critics of neoconservatism
Critics of religions
Environmental philosophers
Epistemologists
Academic staff of European Graduate School
Feminist philosophers
Feminist studies scholars
Feminist theorists
Framing theorists
Gender studies academics
Jewish American academics
Jewish anti-Zionism in the United States
Jewish ethicists
Jewish feminists
Jewish philosophers
Jewish socialists
Jewish women writers
Jews and Judaism in Cleveland
Lesbian academics
Lesbian feminists
Lesbian Jews
LGBT and Judaism
LGBT people from Ohio
LGBT philosophers
Literacy and society theorists
Literary theorists
Literature educators
Living people
Mass media theorists
Metaphysicians
Metaphysics writers
Ontologists
Palestinian solidarity activists
Phenomenologists
Philosophers from Ohio
Philosophers of art
Philosophers of culture
Philosophers of education
Philosophers of history
Philosophers of Judaism
Philosophers of literature
Philosophers of mind
Philosophers of psychology
Philosophers of science
Philosophers of sexuality
Philosophers of social science
Political philosophers
Post-Zionists
Postmodern feminists
Queer theorists
Social philosophers
Sociologists of art
Theorists on Western civilization
Transfeminists
Transgender studies academics
University of California, Berkeley faculty
Wesleyan University faculty
Women literary critics
Writers about activism and social change
Writers from Cleveland
Writers from Shaker Heights, Ohio
Yale College alumni
Yale Graduate School of Arts and Sciences alumni
Presidents of the Modern Language Association
American non-binary writers
Jewish anti-racism activists